Ruben Bemelmans and Laurynas Grigelis took the title, beating Purav Raja and Sanam Singh 6–3, 4–6, [11–9]

Seeds

Draw

Draw

References 
 Main Draw

Comerica Bank Challenger - Doubles
Nordic Naturals Challenger